Setomaa Parish is a rural municipality of Estonia, in Võru County. It has a population of 2,849 (as of 1 January 2022) and an area of 463.1 km².

Demographics
Population in the municipality:

2000: 4,206

2011: 2,990

2022: 2,849

Settlements
There is one small borough (alevik) Värska and 156 villages (küla) in Setomaa Parish.
 The villages are: Ala-Tsumba, Antkruva, Audjassaare, Beresje, Ermakova, Helbi, Hilana, Hilläkeste, Hindsa, Holdi, Härmä, Ignasõ, Igrise, Jaanimäe, Juusa, Jõksi, Järvepää, Kahkva, Kalatsova, Kangavitsa, Karamsina, Karisilla, Kasakova, Kastamara, Keerba, Kiiova, Kiislova, Kiksova, Kitsõ, Klistina, Koidula, Kolodavitsa, Kolossova, Koorla, Korela, Korski, Kossa, Kostkova, Kremessova, Kriiva, Kuigõ, Kuksina, Kundruse, Kusnetsova, Kõõru, Käre, Küllätüvä, Laossina, Leimani, Lepä, Lindsi, Litvina, Lobotka, Lutepää, Lutja, Lütä, Lüübnitsa, Maaslova, Marinova, Martsina, Masluva, Matsuri, Melso, Merekülä, Meremäe, Miikse, Mikitamäe, Miku, Mokra, Määsi, Määsovitsa, Napi, Navikõ, Nedsaja, Niitsiku, Obinitsa, Olehkova, Ostrova, Paklova, Palandõ, Palo, Paloveere, Pattina, Pelsi, Perdaku, Pliia, Podmotsa, Poksa, Polovina, Popovitsa, Pruntova, Puista, Puugnitsa, Põrstõ, Raotu, Rokina, Ruutsi, Rõsna, Rääptsova, Rääsolaane, Saabolda, Saagri, Saatse, Samarina, Selise, Seretsüvä, Serga, Sesniki, Sirgova, Sulbi, Säpina, Talka, Tedre, Tepia, Tessova, Teterüvä, Tiastõ, Tiilige, Tiirhanna, Tiklasõ, Tobrova, Tonja, Toodsi, Toomasmäe, Treiali, Treski, Triginä, Tserebi, Tsergondõ, Tsirgu, Tsumba, Tuplova, Tuulova, Tääglova, Ulaskova, Ulitina, Usinitsa, Uusvada, Vaaksaarõ, Vaartsi, Varesmäe, Vasla, Vedernika, Velna, Veretinä, Verhulitsa, Vinski, Viro, Voropi, Võmmorski, Võpolsova, Võõpsu, Väike-Rõsna, Väiko-Härmä, Väiko-Serga, Õrsava.

Religion

References